Carabus karpinskii is a species of ground beetle in Carabinae subfamily, that is endemic to Russia. Their larvae is either whitish-yellow (female) or whitish-brown (male) coloured.

References

karpinskii
Beetles described in 1993
Endemic fauna of Russia